Harold J. "Pete" Hatch (March 22, 1911 – October 16, 1975) was an American football coach. Hatch was the third head football coach at Ithaca College in Ithaca, New York, serving for four seasons, from 1947 to 1950, and compiling a record of 12–13.

Hatch died in 1975 at a hospital in Rochester, New York.

References

1911 births
1975 deaths
Ithaca Bombers football coaches